The spot-breasted scimitar babbler (Erythrogenys mcclellandi) is a species of bird in the family Timaliidae.

It is found in Eastern Himalaya and western Myanmar. Its natural habitats are subtropical or tropical moist lowland forest and subtropical or tropical moist montane forest. It is threatened by the bioaccumulation of mercury in its features.

References

Collar, N. J. & Robson, C. 2007. Family Timaliidae (Babblers)  pp. 70 – 291 in; del Hoyo, J., Elliott, A. & Christie, D.A. eds. Handbook of the Birds of the World, Vol. 12. Picathartes to Tits and Chickadees. Lynx Edicions, Barcelona.

spot-breasted scimitar babbler
Birds of Eastern Himalaya
Birds of Myanmar
spot-breasted scimitar babbler
Taxonomy articles created by Polbot